Ren Long (born 21 December 1988) is a Chinese biathlete. He competed at the Biathlon World Championships 2011, 2012 and 2013. He competed at the 2014 Winter Olympics in Sochi, in the sprint and individual contests.

References 

1988 births
Living people
Biathletes at the 2014 Winter Olympics
Chinese male biathletes
Olympic biathletes of China
Olympic cross-country skiers of China
Chinese male cross-country skiers
Cross-country skiers at the 2006 Winter Olympics
Asian Games medalists in biathlon
Biathletes at the 2007 Asian Winter Games
Biathletes at the 2011 Asian Winter Games
Asian Games gold medalists for China
Asian Games silver medalists for China
Asian Games bronze medalists for China
Medalists at the 2007 Asian Winter Games
Medalists at the 2011 Asian Winter Games
Sport shooters from Liaoning
Skiers from Liaoning